KIT- KalaignarKarunanidhi Institute of Technology is an Autonomous Institution located in Coimbatore, Tamil Nadu, India. The college has been approved by the All India Council for Technical Education, affiliated to Anna University, Chennai and accredited by NBA and accredited with 'A' grade by NAAC.

The Kalaignar Karunanidhi Institute of Technology was established by Vijayalakshmi Palanisamy Charitable Trust in the year of 2008 in Coimbatore. The colleges offers 8 undergraduate and 7 postgraduate courses.

Courses offered

Under Graduate Courses
B.E. - Aeronautical Engineering
B.E. - Agriculture Engineering
B.E. -Bio Medical Engineering
B.E. - Computer Science and Engineering
B.E. - Electrical and Electronics Engineering
B.E. - Electronics and Communication Engineering
B.E. - Mechanical Engineering
B.Tech. - Biotechnology
B.Tech. - Artificial intelligence and data science
B.tech.-Computer Science and Business System
Post Graduate Courses

M.E. - Applied Electronics
M.E. - Computer Science and Engineering
M.E. - Engineering Design
M.E. - Power Systems Engineering
M.E. - VLSI Design
MBA - Master of Business Administration
MCA - Master of Computer Applications

Gallery

References

External links
 

Engineering colleges in Coimbatore
Colleges affiliated to Anna University
Educational institutions established in 2008
2008 establishments in Tamil Nadu